Jonathan Nicholas Langham (August 4, 1861 – May 21, 1945) was a Republican member of the U.S. House of Representatives from Pennsylvania.

Biography
Langham was born near Hillsdale, Pennsylvania.  He taught school, and graduated from the State Normal School at Indiana, Pennsylvania, in 1882.  He studied law, was admitted to the Indiana County, Pennsylvania bar in December 1888 and commenced practice in Indiana, Pennsylvania.  He served as postmaster of Indiana, Pennsylvania, from 1892 to 1893, as assistant United States attorney for the western district of Pennsylvania from 1898 to 1904, and as chief clerk and corporation deputy in the auditor general’s department of Pennsylvania from 1904 to 1909.

Langham was elected as a Republican to the Sixty-first, Sixty-Second, and Sixty-third Congresses.  He was not a candidate for renomination in 1914.  In 1915 he was elected judge of the court of common pleas for the fortieth judicial district of Pennsylvania for a term of ten years, reelected in 1925 and served until his retirement in January 1936.  He died in Indiana, Pennsylvania, in 1945.  Interment in Oakland Cemetery.

Sources

The Political Graveyard

1861 births
1945 deaths
Judges of the Pennsylvania Courts of Common Pleas
People from Indiana, Pennsylvania
Republican Party members of the United States House of Representatives from Pennsylvania